Cuesta del Lipán is a town and municipality in Jujuy Province in Argentina.

References

Populated places in Jujuy Province

es:Cuesta del Lipán